Unione Rugby Sannio (founded on August 27, 1998)  is a sport society dedicated to rugby union, located in San Giorgio del Sannio, Benevento, Italy, member of the FIR

The Beginning 

The company was founded in 1998 to give life to a project rugby "high quality" in the initiative of a group of 20 founding members of the three associations involved in rugby decades of Sannio, in close consultation with the oldest rugby tradition of Campania.

Makers are involved in the project from the beginning, hiring several of the best coaches in the FIR, dozens of athletes entered by the owners, in the circuit of national youth teams are mixed by an executive team that, besides the figure of the passion, constantly refers to the method of management.

Hall of Fame 
 Updated on March 6, 2011.

Notable all time players 

 Fabio Tirelli
 Claudio Gaudiello
 Andrea Porrazzo
 Roberto Napoli
 Juan Sebastián Francesio
 Alejandro Krancz
 Alejo Corral
 Alfredo Giuria

Links & References 

http://www.ilquaderno.it/unione-rugby-sannio-fernando-fossi-confermato-guida-prima-squadra-26526.html

http://www.ilsannita.it/20110504-60352-under-18-elite-la-forturon-unione-rugby-sannio-alle-fasi-finali-nazionali/

Sports organizations established in 1998